Phenax is a genus of flowering plants belonging to the family Urticaceae.

Its native range is Mexico to Tropical America.

Species
Species:

Phenax angustifolius 
Phenax asper 
Phenax bullatus 
Phenax ekmanii 
Phenax erectus 
Phenax flavifolius 
Phenax globulifera 
Phenax granulatus 
Phenax grossecrenatus 
Phenax haitensis 
Phenax hirtus 
Phenax integrifolius 
Phenax laevigatus 
Phenax laevis 
Phenax laxiflorus 
Phenax madagascariensis 
Phenax mexicanus 
Phenax microcarpus 
Phenax microphyllus 
Phenax pauciflorus 
Phenax pauciserratus 
Phenax perrieri 
Phenax poiretii 
Phenax rugosus 
Phenax sessilifolius 
Phenax sonneratii 
Phenax uliginosus 
Phenax weddellianus

References

Urticaceae
Urticaceae genera